Saint-Joachim de Pointe-Claire Church is a Roman Catholic church in Pointe-Claire, Quebec, Canada.

History

The first church on the site was a stone church built in 1713. A replacement was built between 1750 and 1755.

From 1868 to 1881 a third church was built alongside the second church according to plans by architect Victor Bourgeau. In April 1881 a fire destroyed both the old church and the new church. Some masonry from the old church was reused, as were the walls of the sacristy Construction of a replica was undertaken that year, and consecration was in September 1885. The organ was installed by the Compagnie d'Orgues Canadiennes in 1928. The church was restored in 1963–1964 and again in 1987.

Design
It is made of grey stone in the Gothic Revival style, with the floorplan in the shape of a Latin cross. The exterior features buttresses, and a monumental steeple. The perfectly symmetrical design includes pinnacle-topped turrets at either side of the facade.

The walls include by gothic style windows. Frames and ornaments are hammered stone. The ornate interior includes many niches containing statues of the saints. carved patterns of quatrefoils. The apse comprises seven angled wall sections.

References

Further reading
André Croteau, Les belles églises du Québec - Montréal, Édition du trécarré, 1996, p. 84-87

J
Joachim de Pointe-Claire
Joachim de Pointe-Claire
Gothic Revival church buildings in Canada
Burned buildings and structures in Canada
Rebuilt churches in Canada
Buildings and structures in Pointe-Claire